Alexander George Bonsor (7 October 1851 – 17 August 1907) was one of the earliest known footballers.

Career
Bonsor played in the 1872 FA Cup Final – the first ever final in the FA Cup's history – and finished on the winning side. He played for the Wanderers that day, and with Wanderers he won the cup the following year as well.

Bonsor appeared in the 1875 final playing for Old Etonians, scoring a goal, as his side drew 1–1. They lost the replay, but Bonsor was back in the final the following year. He played for Old Etonians again, and scored again. Old Etonians drew that match 1–1 but, once again, lost the replay.

He played twice for England against Scotland. He also scored England's second-ever international goal against the latter during England's 4–2 victory in March 1873.

Honours
Wanderers
 FA Cup winners: 1872 & 1873

Old Etonians
 FA Cup finalists: 1875 & 1876

International goals
Scores and results list England's goal tally first.

References

1851 births
1907 deaths
Association football forwards
England international footballers
England v Scotland representative footballers (1870–1872)
English footballers
FA Cup Final players
Old Etonians F.C. players
Outfield association footballers who played in goal
People educated at Eton College
Wanderers F.C. players